This is a list of American football players who played for the Columbus Panhandles in the National Football League (NFL).  It includes players that have played at least one match in the NFL regular season.  The Columbus Panhandles franchise was founded in 1901 and lasted until 1922, when they became the Columbus Tigers. The team folded in 1926.

Key

Players

D
John Davis

E
Charlie Essman

F
Jim Flower

G
Hal Gaulke,
Morris Glassman,
Andy Gump

H
Babe Houck,
Ted Hopkins,

K
Bob Karch,
Earl Krieger,
Oscar Kuehner

L
Frank Lone Star

M
Wilkie Moody,
Joe Mulbarger,
Ted Murtha

N
Al Nesser,
Charlie Nesser,
Frank Nesser,
Fred Nesser,
John Nesser,
Phil Nesser,
Ray Nesser,
Ted Nesser,

P
Dwight Peabody

R
Bob Rapp,
Walt Rogers,
Emmett Ruh,
Homer Ruh

S
John Schneider,
Pete Schultze,
Al Shook,
Lee Snoots,
Mark Stevenson
Spiers

W
Will Waite,
Don Wiper,
Oscar Wolford

Y
Howard Yerges

Z
Paul Ziegler

Notes

References 
 

Columbus P
Columbus Panhandles